A pumice raft is a floating raft of pumice created by some eruptions of submarine volcanoes or coastal subaerial volcanoes.

Biologists suggest that animals and plants have migrated from island to island on pumice rafts.

Pumice rafts have unique characteristics such as the highest surface-area-to-volume ratio known for any rock type, long term flotation and beaching in the tidal zone, exposure to a variety of conditions, including dehydration, and an ability to absorb many potentially advantageous elements/compounds. For at least these reasons,  astrobiologists have hypothetically proposed pumice rafts as an ideal substrate for the origin of life.

Notable examples

Volcanic activity in the South Pacific near Tonga on August 12, 2006 caused the emergence of a new island. The crew of the Maiken, a yacht that had left the northern Tongan islands group of Vava'u in August, reported that they had seen streaks of light, porous pumice stone floating in the water—and then had "sailed into a vast, many-miles-wide belt of densely packed pumice". They went on to witness the ephemeral island known as Home Reef breaching the surface.

A very large pumice raft appeared near New Zealand in August 2012. A possible source for the pumice was the July 2012 eruption of Havre seamount in the Kermadec Islands north of New Zealand. (See: 2012 Kermadec Islands eruption).

In August 2019, a large floating pumice raft covering  was discovered in the tropical Pacific Ocean near Late Island in the Kingdom of Tonga. Sailors described a “rubble slick made up of rocks from marble to basketball size such that water was not visible,” as well as a smell of sulfur.

Sandy Island, a non-existent island near New Caledonia, was reported in 1876 by the whaling ship Velocity and subsequently included on some maps well into the 20th century. According to a team of University of Sydney scientists, it is possible that this false report may have been occasioned by pumice rafts being mistaken by the Velocity for dry land.

See also
Curacoa volcano
Floating island
Lava balloons

References

External links
Pumice raft in South China Sea near Vietnam in August 1986
Pumice rafts in Fiji produced by the eruption of Home Reef volcano, Tonga in 2006

Volcanoes
Volcanology
Rafts
Floating islands